Geochang Polytechnic College, also Keochang Polytechnic College, is a technical college located in Geochang County, South Gyeongsang Province, South Korea.  It is affiliated with the nationwide Korean Foundation for Polytechnic Colleges.   It first opened its doors in 1997.

Campus
The campus is located in Geochang-eup, a short distance outside the town.  There are seven principal buildings on the campus, including a library and dormitory.

History
The college received permission to open on the last day of 1996, and welcomed its first students only three months later.  At the time it had six departments, as it does now.  The first entering class consisted of 132 students.

Organization

The college has six academic departments:  Mechatronics, Industrial Design, Automotive, Electrical Instrumentation and Control, Electronics, and Computer Assisted Design.  Courses of study are two years in length.

Students and faculty
About 200 students enter the college each year.  The graduation rate averages about 80%.

See also
List of colleges and universities in South Korea
Education in South Korea

External links
Official college website, in English and Korean

Universities and colleges in South Gyeongsang Province
Geochang County
Educational institutions established in 1997
1997 establishments in South Korea